Maya Reis Gabeira (born April 10, 1987) is a Brazilian big wave surfer. She also held the previous record for biggest wave ever surfed by a woman, of  established in January 2018.

Gabeira has received numerous accolades including the ESPY award for Best Female Action Sports Athlete and is the best female surfers in the world as well as one of the most influential female surfers of all time.

Career 

Gabeira started surfing at age 13 in Rio de Janeiro and started competing at 15 years old. In 2004 she decided to become a professional at 17 while living in Australia and moved to Hawaii that same year to surf world class waves.

She quickly emerged as the world's top female big-wave surfer, winning global championships surfing challenging spots like Mavericks, Waimea, Todos Santos, and South Africa's shark-infested "Dungeons".

She has won the Billabong XXL Global Big Wave Awards for four consecutive times (2007 to 2010) in the Best Female Performance category.

In 2008, she became the first woman to surf big waves in Alaska. Gabeira also became the first woman to surf California's Ghost Trees and Tahiti's Teahupoo.

In 2009, Gabeira won the ESPY award for Best Female Action Sports Athlete. Later that year, Gabeira surfed the biggest wave ever by a woman when she successfully rode a  wave at Dungeons, a big-wave surf spot in South Africa.

In 2010, she got the 2010 Teen Choice Award for Best Female Action Sports Star.

In 2012, she was awarded the XXL Big Wave Awards for Girls Best Overall Performance for the 5th time. She also appeared in the ESPN The Body Issue that same year.

On October 28, 2013, Gabeira lost consciousness and nearly drowned while surfing a massive wave at Praia do Norte, Nazaré, Portugal; she was saved by her fellow Brazilian big-wave surfer Carlos Burle. She had to be revived on the beach and later ended up in the hospital.

In 2016 the documentary Return to Nazaré by Red Bull TV shows how Maya Gabeira returned to Nazaré after having suffered the accident surfing on the same beach in 2013. It is the portrait of a struggle to overcome obstacles, both physical and mental.

In January 2018 Gabeira surfed a  wave in Nazare, PT, recorded by Guinness World Records as the biggest wave surfed by a woman.

Gabeira has been nominated twice for the Laureus World Sports Award for Action Sportsperson of the Year, in 2014 and in 2019.

She is one of the highest paid big wave surfers on the planet. Gabeira is sponsored by Billabong and Red bull and currently lives in North Shore (Oahu) in Hawaii in the United States.

In February 11, 2020, Gabeira set a new Guinness World Record for the Largest wave surfed (unlimited) - female. It was held in WSL Nazaré Tow Surfin contest and the wave measured . The wave was also the biggest wave surfed by anyone that year.

She is the subject of the 2022 documentary film Maya and the Wave.

Personal life

Gabeira is the daughter of Fernando Gabeira, one of the founding members of the Green Party of Brazil. Her father is the son of Lebanese immigrants. Her mother, Yamê Reis, is a Brazilian fashion designer.

References

External links
 Maya Gabeira - Official Home Page 

Living people
Brazilian surfers
1987 births
Female surfers
World Surf League surfers
Brazilian people of Lebanese descent
Brazilian sportswomen
Sportspeople of Lebanese descent
Sportspeople from Rio de Janeiro (city)